Amjad Ali is a Pakistani politician who is the current Provincial Minister of Khyber Pakhtunkhwa for Mines and Minerals Development, in office since 29 August 2018. He had been a member of the Provincial Assembly of Khyber Pakhtunkhwa from August 2018 till January 2023.

Previously, he was a member of the Provincial Assembly of Khyber Pakhtunkhwa from May 2013 to May 2018.

Early life and education
He was born on 4 October 1973 in Swat District, Pakistan.

He holds MBBS degree.

Political career
He was elected to the Provincial Assembly of Khyber Pakhtunkhwa as a candidate of Pakistan Tehreek-e-Insaf (PTI) from Constituency PK-82 (Swat-III) in 2013 Pakistani general election. He received 15,086 votes and defeated Waqar Ahmad Khan, a candidate of Awami National Party (ANP).

He was re-elected to the Provincial Assembly of Khyber Pakhtunkhwa as a candidate of PTI from Constituency PK-6 (Swat-V) in 2018 Pakistani general election.

On 29 August 2018, he was inducted into the provincial Khyber Pakhtunkhwa cabinet of Chief Minister Mahmood Khan and was appointed as Provincial Minister of Khyber Pakhtunkhwa for Mines and Minerals Development.

References

1973 births
Living people
Khyber Pakhtunkhwa MPAs 2013–2018
People from Swat District
Pakistan Tehreek-e-Insaf MPAs (Khyber Pakhtunkhwa)
Khyber Pakhtunkhwa MPAs 2018–2023